Stankovce is a village and municipality in the Trebišov District in the Košice Region of eastern Slovakia.

Villages and municipalities in Trebišov District